The 1967–68 French Rugby Union Championship was contested by 64 teams divided in 8 pools. The first four of each pool, were qualified for the "last 32".

The Lourdes won the Championship 1967-68 after beating the Toulon in the final. The two teams tied the match (9–9) after overtime and Lourdes was declared champion for the greatest number of tries scored.

Context 

Il 1968 saw the "équipe de France" obtained his first Grand Chelem in the 1968 Five Nations Championship.

The final of the championship was delayed of 3 weeks for the riot of the évènements de Mai 1968
 
The French rugby lost Guy Boniface (Mont-de-Marsan) and Jean-Michel Capendeguy (Saint-Jean-de-Luz), dead in car accidents,

The Challenge Yves du Manoir was won in 1968 by the Narbonne that beat Dax in the final (14–6).

Qualification round 
In bold the qualified to next round

"Last 32" 
In bold the clubs qualified for the next round

"Last 16" 
In bold the clubs qualified for the next round

Quarter of finals 
In bold the clubs qualified for the next round

Semifinals

Final 

The facts of May 1968 retarded of three weeks of this match.

As consequence, was changed the rules: in case of equity at the end of over time, will be declared champion Lourdes that score 2 tries against none. This is also because the national team had to start for the 1968 France rugby union team tour to Nez Zealand.

External links 
 Compte rendu finale de 1968 lnr.fr
 Finale 1968 par finalesrugby.com

1968
France 1968
Championship